Wushu at the 2007 Southeast Asian Games was held at the Kepkanchana Hall in the Chanaphonlakhan Institute of Technology, Nakhon Ratchasima, Thailand

Medal tally

Medalists

Taolu

Men

Women

Sanda

Men

Women

External links
Southeast Asian Games Official Results
 

2007 Southeast Asian Games events
2007
2007 in wushu (sport)